A constitutional referendum was held in Egypt on 11 September 1971. The changes to the constitution were approved by 99.98% of voters, with a turnout of 95.1%.

Results

References

Egypt
1971 in Egypt
Referendums in Egypt
Constitutional referendums in Egypt
September 1971 events in Africa